Few Brewster (May 10, 1889 – October 12, 1957) was a justice of the Supreme Court of Texas from September 21, 1945 to September 20, 1957.

References

Justices of the Texas Supreme Court
1889 births
1957 deaths
20th-century American judges